Linganapalle is a village in the state of Andhra Pradesh, India. It lies in Chittoor district, 28 km north of the town of Chittoor. Linganapalle is famous for its mangoes, sugarcane and poultry.

References

Villages in Chittoor district